Captain José Raimundo Carrillo (1749–1809) was Californio soldier and settler, known as an early settler of San Diego, California and as the founder of the Carrillo family of California.

Biography
Carrillo was born in 1749 in New Spain (present-day México) at Loreto, Baja California. He came to upper Las Californias as a soldier with the first expedition of Gaspar de Portolà in 1769, and rose to rank of Captain.

Carrillo served at the Presidio of Santa Barbara, Presidio of Monterey, and in 1806, the Presidio of San Diego.
He was commandant of the Presidio of San Diego during 1807–1809.
In 1809 he died and was buried in the chapel on Presidio Hill November 10, 1809.

On April 23, 1781 Carrillo married Tomasa Ignacia Lugo, daughter of the soldier Francisco Lugo, with the ceremony performed by Junipero Serra at San Carlos, New Spain.

His Grandson, Juan José Carrillo (1842-1916), the mayor of Santa Monica, California.
His Great-great Grandson, Leo Carrillo, (1881-1961) was a Hollywood actor and conservationist.

References

1749 births
1809 deaths
Californios
People of Alta California
History of San Diego
People from San Diego
People from Loreto Municipality, Baja California Sur